Mihkel Juhkam (3 August 1884 Küti Parish (now Vinni Parish), Wierland County – 28 January 1942 Sosva camp, Sverdlovsk Oblast) was an Estonian politician. He was a member of the II, III, IV and IV Riigikogu. 1929 he was Minister of Defence.

References

1884 births
1942 deaths
People from Vinni Parish
People from Kreis Wierland
Estonian Labour Party politicians
National Centre Party (Estonia) politicians
Defence Ministers of Estonia
Members of the Estonian Constituent Assembly
Members of the Riigikogu, 1923–1926
Members of the Riigikogu, 1926–1929
Members of the Riigikogu, 1929–1932
Members of the Riigikogu, 1932–1934
Estonian military personnel of the Estonian War of Independence
Estonian people who died in Soviet detention
People who died in the Gulag